Ayb Educational Foundation was founded in 2006 in Armenia. The objective of the foundation is to "shape a culture of excellence in learning" and support the development of Armenian education.

The idea behind the Ayb educational movement is to transform human life and the future of Armenia through education.  As an organization implementing development projects and essential changes in the field of education, Ayb is carrying out projects across Armenia, Artsakh and the diaspora to ensure the best authentic education for Armenian children. Ayb's projects have become a unique testing ground for the best educational initiatives, on the basis of which educational strategies, research and technologies are being developed. Around 125,000 participants and 1100 educational establishments from all over Armenia and Artsakh are annually involved in Ayb's projects. The Ayb Educational Foundation has initiated large-scale educational projects, such as Ayb School, scholarships for students admitted to Ayb High School, Dilijan Central School, Araratian Baccalaureate, mass school contests, Khan Academy Armenia, AybLabs and numerous other projects that transform the Armenian educational reality.

Structure 
Ayb was founded in 2006 by visionaries, who believe education has played a paramount role in their professional and life achievements and wish to improve the educational environment in Armenia through joint efforts. The founders of Ayb are:
 Ashot Aslanian (Armenia/Russia, founder of Aeorsib Company)
 Aram Pakhchanian (Armenia, vice president of ABBYY),
 Arthur Berd (France/USA, founder of General Quantitative, Wealth Technologies),
 David Pakhchanian (Armenia/Russia)
 Karen Musaelian (USA, co-founder of Duality Technology Inc.)
 Karo Sargsyan (Russia, businessman, founder of Spetstorg Company)
 Fr. Mesrop Aramian (Armenia, chairman of Vem Radio)

The supreme governing body of the Ayb Educational Foundation is the Board of Trustees.  Members of the board of trustees serve two-year terms.

Aram Pakhchanian is the Chair of the Board of Trustees, and Sona Koshetsyan is the Executive Director of the Ayb Educational Foundation.

Projects 
The main programs implemented by the Ayb Educational Foundation are:
 Ayb School (Elementary, Middle and High), operating since  2011. Ayb High School is the largest social initiative in the non-state sphere, where 75% of the students receive full or partial scholarship.
 Dilijan Central School, which belongs to the family of Ayb Schools and is the first school project of Ayb realized by external order and funding.
 Araratian Baccalaureate, which the Ayb Educational Foundation implements in collaboration with the University of Cambridge (UK) and University College London Institute of Education.
 Two Fab labs: workshop laboratory created by the Massachusetts Institute of Technology (MIT), equipped with special tools and materials. 
Khan Academy Armenia. More than 2800 Armenian videos on YouTube and 12,000 Armenian articles and exercises. 
 Mass school contests – The International Kangaroo Mathematics Contest, Meghu Armenian Language Contest, the Russian Bear International Contest of the Russian Language, All Armenian Tournament of Young Chemists, National Stage of World Robot Olympiad, and Tournament for Chemistry Students in the field of higher education. 
 Modern subject laboratories – AybLabs.
 Intensive subject courses.
 Master classes.

History 
In February 2006, willing to contribute to the development of Armenia and having numerous opportunities of investing their time, efforts and funds, eight friends met in Moscow and decided to establish Ayb Educational Foundation and Ayb Club. In December, Ayb Educational Foundation was officially established. In the same month, Ayb’s first program, Intensive Subject Courses, was launched. Within the framework of this program, Ayb’s educational methodologies were conceived and tested.

In May 2007, Ayb opened the first modern Physics lab – AybLab at the PhysMath School in Yerevan. As of today, there are eight AybLabs at five schools in four provinces (marzes) in Armenia. In the same year, when few people had access to internet in Armenia, Ayb made thousands of academic materials of MIT OpenCourseWare publication accessible for applicants, students and professors of 33 HEIs in Armenia, without the need to access the internet.

In May 2008, Ayb conducted the first pilot for the International Kangaroo Mathematics Contest in Armenia. In 2010, two other mass school contests were launched – All Armenian Tournament for Young Chemists and the Russian Bear International Contest of the Russian Language. In 2014, Ayb developed and for the first time implemented Meghu Armenian Language Contest in Armenia and Artsakh. Since 2016, Ayb Educational Foundation also organizes the national stage of one of the most popular mass school robotics contests – the World Robot Olympiad – in Armenia.

In August 2009, a series of master classes was launched for chemistry teachers of various Armenian schools. Later on, this program developed into master classes in various formats for various audiences.

In January 2010, in its first session of the year, the Government of Armenia passed a decree to allocate 6.5 ha land adjacent to the Tbilisi highway in Yerevan to Ayb Educational Foundation for the implementation of the Ayb Learning Hub (Ayb School) project. In October 2011, Ayb High School was opened. The Ayb Educational Foundation provides scholarships to around 75% of the students admitted to Ayb High School, providing equal opportunities for all the students of Ayb High School.

In July 2013, the Central Bank of Armenia and the Ayb Educational Foundation signed a cooperation agreement on opening a school in Dilijan equipped with Ayb’s educational technologies. In September 2013, the first academic year of the Dilijan Central School started in a temporary location and construction of the main school building was launched. The building was opened in September 2015.

In January 2014, collaborating with the University of Cambridge and University College London Institute of Education, Ayb Educational Foundation started a large-scale national educational initiative – the National Program for Educational Excellence (NPEE). Its main instrument – the Araratian Baccalaureate (AB), a globally competitive academic program developed by Ayb was introduced at Ayb School in September 2015. In May 2016, Ayb School students took first-ever Araratian Baccalaureate exams, which are accredited by the Cambridge International Examinations (CIE) as being equivalent to Cambridge A Levels.

In October 2015, two fablabs (fabrication laboratories designed by MIT) were opened adjunct to the Ayb School in Yerevan and the Dilijan Central School.

In 2017, the Ayb Educational Foundation created Khan Academy Armenia, an online education platform for Armenian learners.

References

Educational organizations based in Armenia